Starship Troopers is a pinball arcade game released by Sega Pinball in 1997. And The game is based on 1997 movie of the same name.

Description
The player as a member of the mobile infantry has to free six bug-infested planets and then to capture the Brain Bug. There are different species of insects: Warriors, Plasma Bugs, Hoppers and Tankers.

The game has several multiball modes and very fast gameplay. The playfield contains a moving Warrior Bug and a Brain Bug pop-up.

Digital versions
Starship Troopers is available as a licensed table in The Pinball Arcade. Sega logos and a cameo by Sonic the Hedgehog in the match sequence are removed from the table because of licensing issues.

The table was also released for Stern Pinball Arcade. As in the Pinball Arcade, Sega logos and Sonic the Hedgehog cameo were removed.

References

External links

1997 pinball machines
Games based on Starship Troopers
Pinball machines based on films
Sega pinball machines